The Woluwe is a stream that goes through several municipalities in the southeast and east of Brussels and is a right tributary of the Senne/Zenne (in Vilvoorde). The Kleine Maalbeek is a tributary of the Woluwe (in Kraainem).  Many ponds formed along the stream over time, among which the Mellaerts Ponds still exist.  The valley of the Woluwe crosses the municipalities of Auderghem, Watermael-Boitsfort, Woluwe-Saint-Pierre, Woluwe-Saint-Lambert, Kraainem, Zaventem, Machelen and Vilvoorde.

The towns of Woluwe-Saint-Pierre, Woluwe-Saint-Lambert and Sint-Stevens-Woluwe derive their name from it.

See also 
 Woluwe-Saint-Lambert (Dutch: Sint-Lambrechts-Woluwe)
 Woluwe-Saint-Pierre (Dutch: Sint-Pieters-Woluwe)
 Sint-Stevens-Woluwe (French: Woluwe-Saint-Etienne) 
 UCLouvain Brussels Woluwe

References
 Kraainem

External links
 Map of the Woluwe in Brussels

Rivers of Belgium
Rivers of Brussels
Auderghem
Evere
Vilvoorde
Watermael-Boitsfort
Woluwe-Saint-Lambert
Woluwe-Saint-Pierre
Zaventem